Blacksummers'night may refer to:

BLACKsummers'night (2009), an album by Maxwell
blackSUMMERS'night (2016), an album by Maxwell